Theodosius of Sinai, was a Bulgarian priest, writer and printer. He founded the first Bulgarian printing-house in Thessaloniki. Although Theodosius died before the earliest expressions of incipient Macedonian national identity, he is considered an ethnic Macedonian in North Macedonia.

Life 

Teodosius was born in the late 18th century in the town of Dojran, Ottoman Empire (today in North Macedonia).  His birth name was Teohar. After he had finished Greek language school in Istanbul, Teohar went back to Dojran, where he got married and was later ordained a priest.  The death of his wife however drove him into a pilgrimage to the Holy Land. In 1828 Teohar became a monk in Saint Catherine's Monastery and there he adopted the monastic name Teodosiues (Theodosiy in Bulgarian).

After returning to the Balkans, Theodosius was appointed a priest in "St. Minas" church in Solun (Thessaloniki) in 1831. While in Solun, he established the firsts printing house in Bulgarian language in 1838. Theodosius used the movable type printing press of Daskal Kamche from Vatasha.  The moveable types of the press were crafted by a Russian immigrant type-founder.  The first books, typed in Teodosius's printing house, were "Primary study through Slavonic-Bulgarian and Greek Orthodox morning prayers" („Началное учение с молитви утренния славяноболгарский и греческия“) and "Jewish ceremony and all of the harms, they've done" - an anti-Semitic lampoon, which was initially translated "to simple and plain Bulgarian language" by Nathanael Ohridski. In 1839 Teodosius typed his own "A Brief description of twenty monasteries that are situated in the Holly Mount Athos".

In 1839 Teodosius' printing-house was burned down, but it was soon restored with the finansical support of Kiril Peychinovich. Peychinovich's book Utesheniе Greshnim ("Solace of the sinner") was typed in the restored printing-house in 1840. Teodosius wrote an introduction to the book, where he mentioned that the book was written by Kiril Peychinovich into "...the plainest Bulgarian language, spoken in Lower Moesia, and the region of Skopje and Tetovo...". There Teodosius also praised the Bulgarian language and compared it to a key, which can unlock the heart of the Bulgarian nation for the light of the truth.

In 1841 Teodosius typed a book, called "A book for studying three languages - Slavonic-Bulgarian, Greek and Karamanlian".  The book was a Bulgarian-Greek-Turkish dictionary, designed to be of use for merchants.

In 1843 a fire destroyed Teodosius's printing house for a second and final time. Theodosius returned to Dojran, where he began working as a miller in his sons' water-mill. According to Arseniy Kostentsev, the usable remains of Theodosius' printing press were taken to the village of Vataša.

Theodosius died in an accident in March 1843. He was killed by a collapsed roof.

Nine years after Theodosius' death, the brothers Kiryak and Konstantin Darzhilovi opened a new Bulgarian language printing press in Thessaloniki.

References

Sources
 "Началное Оучение с Молитви Оутренния Славяноболгарский и Греческия" - The first book printed by Theodosius of Sinai in Salonica in 1838.
 Марин Дринов, Първата българска типография в Солун и някои от напечатаните в нея книги. – Периодическо списание на Българското книжовно дружество, год. 7, кн. 31, 1889
 Шоповъ, А. "Първата българска печатница въ Солунъ. Синаитски архимандритъ Хаджи попъ Теодосий", Пловдивъ, 1895.
 Български възрожденски книжовници от Македония: избрани страници (отг. ред. Иван Дуриданов). С., 1983, 61-71

18th-century births
1843 deaths
People from Dojran
Bulgarian writers
Bulgarian publishers (people)
Bulgarian printers
19th-century Bulgarian people
Macedonian Bulgarians
Year of birth unknown